6J or 6-J can refer to:

IATA code for Solaseed Air（Ex Skynet Asia Airways）
6-j symbol
6J, a model of SEAT Ibiza
Hughes MH-6J, model of Hughes OH-6  Cayuse
AH-6J, a model of MD Helicopters MH-6 Little Bird
AS.6J, a model of Airspeed Envoy
6J, designator for Clatskanie School District
6J6, see List of caves in Western Australia
WS-6J, engine model in  Xian H-6
CA-6J, a model of  Buhl Airsedan
RE-6J, or Burlington Public School District; see Table of Colorado school districts
T-6J, one of the  North American T-6 Texan variants
6J, the production code for the 1983 Doctor Who serial The King's Demons

See also
J6 (disambiguation)